Direito de Amar is a Brazilian telenovela produced and broadcast by TV Globo in 1987.

Cast

Special participations

References

External links 
 

1987 telenovelas
Brazilian telenovelas
TV Globo telenovelas
1987 Brazilian television series debuts
1987 Brazilian television series endings
Portuguese-language telenovelas